Donald C. Smaltz is an American lawyer who was appointed as Independent Counsel to investigate charges that United States Secretary of Agriculture Mike Espy had received improper gifts from companies with business before his department. Espy was acquitted, but the investigation ended in convictions of some associates and fines for the companies.

Career 

Smaltz was born in Lebanon, Pennsylvania, to a steelworker and an Italian immigrant mother. He attended Pennsylvania State University and Penn State Dickinson Law where he received his J.D. degree in 1961.

Smaltz served as a trial attorney for the Army's Judge Advocate General Corps. He then spent several years as Assistant United States Attorney in Los Angeles, where he specialized in white-collar crime.

In 1975, after moving into private practice, Smaltz grabbed headlines when he and another lawyer accused Watergate prosecutors of misconduct and persuaded a judge to dismiss two indictments against Richard Nixon's personal tax lawyer. Other high-profile clients have included the International Brotherhood of Teamsters and a bank with extensive ties to the late Philippines dictator Ferdinand Marcos and his wife, Imelda Marcos.

During the Bush Administration, Smaltz was asked by Judge George MacKinnon about leading an independent counsel probe into fraud and mismanagement at the United States Department of Housing and Urban Development and to join the Justice Department. Smaltz ultimately turned down the job.

Espy investigation

In 1994, Smaltz accepted an offer to serve as independent counsel in the Mike Espy case, a job he said he originally expected to last six months but ended up lasting four years. Espy was indicted and the case was brought to trial, but Espy was acquitted on all counts. Smaltz's investigation of Espy resulted in 14 indictments, including two convictions, three guilty pleas, four acquittals, and fines for three companies. The investigation cost $17 million.

Personal life 
In 1994, the same year Smaltz began the Espy investigation, he and his wife, Lois Smaltz, adopted two boys from an orphanage in Saint Petersburg, Russia. The Espy case lasted four years, most of which Smaltz spent away from his family, who remained in Rancho Palos Verdes, California. In 2007, Smaltz and his wife retired to Sequim, Washington.

See also
 Bill Clinton
 Mike Espy
 Kenneth Starr
 Independent Counsel
 Lois Smaltz

References

Sources
 Frontline: Secrets of an Independent Counsel: Who is Don Smaltz? - Frontline, PBS
 "Secrets of an Independent Counsel." PBS, 1995

External links
 "OFFICE OF INDEPENDENT COUNSEL - Donald C. Smaltz." CyberCemetery - University of North Texas Libraries & U.S. Government Printing Office. Accessed January 3, 2009.
 "Supreme Court rules Sun Diamond Growers did not violate federal law in Espy case" - CNN, April 27, 1999
"A Harsh Verdict for Espy's Prosecutor" - The Washington Post, December 5, 1998
 "Was this a bad idea?" - CNN, December 14, 1998
 Espy Acquitted in Gifts Case, Washington Post, December 3, 1998; Page A01

Dickinson School of Law alumni
People from Bethlehem, Pennsylvania
American prosecutors
Living people
Year of birth missing (living people)